What Remains of Us is a 2004 Canadian documentary film exploring the survival of the nonviolent resistance movement in Tibet. The documentary was shot over eight years without the knowledge of the Chinese authorities.

Synopsis 

A young Tibetan from Québec, Canada, enters her homeland for the first time — carrying a clandestine video message from the 14th Dalai Lama to Tibetans inside Tibet.

Security 

Released in 2004, the film raised controversy for showing the faces of 103 Tibetans speaking about human rights. Tibetans were informed of the purpose of the filming. The ones who appear made the choice to participate despite the risks.

Hoping to enhance individual safety as much as possible, the NFB implemented strict security measures to all screenings of the film: no cameras or cell phones were allowed in the theater and security guards were watching the audience with infrared night-vision equipment. The goal was to prevent copies of the images of the faces to reach Beijing PLA offices, where photos would make it easier to track and arrest participants.

According to co-director Francois Prevost, for four years circulation was limited, but in 2008 a decision was made to release the film more widely. By 2011, the film was available on Google Video and YouTube, as well as distributed as a DVD.

So far, according to a private network of information and monitoring, no participant of the film has been arrested in Tibet.

Credits 

Produced by François Prévost, written and directed by François Prévost and Hugo Latulippe.
Featuring: Kalsang Dolma, Tibetans from inside Tibet, and the 14th Dalai Lama of Tibet.
Narrated by Kalsang Dolma.
Camera: François Prévost and Hugo Latulippe.
Music by: Techung, René Lussier, Kalsang Dolma
Editing: Annie Jean. Sound Editing: François Senneville

Distributed initially in Québec by the National Film Board of Canada (NFB). 
Later distributed in Canada by Films Séville. Despite the growing success of the film, worldwide distribution had been stopped by the NFB in January 2005 due to the rising costs of security measures surrounding the film.

Awards 

 Official Selection, Cannes International Film Festival, 2004
 Audience Award, Atlantic Film Festival, Halifax 2004
 Canadian Award, Best Feature Film, Atlantic International Film Festival, Halifax 2004
 Best International Documentary, Hollywood Film Festival, Beverly Hills, 2004
 Most Popular Canadian Film, Vancouver International Film Festival, 2004 
 Canada's Top Ten, Toronto International Film Festival Group, 2004
 Nomination for Best Documentary, Genie Awards, 2005
 Best Feature Film, Telluride Mountainfilm Festival, 2005
 Best Documentary Film, Prix Jutra, Montreal, 2005
 Audience Award, Festival du Film des Droits de la Personne, Montreal 2006
 First Prize, Grand Prix Sergio Vieira de Mello, Human Rights Film Festival, Geneva 2007
 Special Mention, Norvegian Peace Film Award, Norway International Film Festival, Tromso, 2008

External links
 Official website (English)
 Site Officiel du film (français)
 

Canadian documentary films
2004 films
Documentary films about politics
Politics of Tibet
National Film Board of Canada documentaries
2004 documentary films
Documentary films about Tibet
Tibetan-language films
Quebec films
Films about the 14th Dalai Lama
2000s Canadian films
Best Documentary Film Jutra and Iris Award winners